Antonio Medellín (15 April 1934 – 18 June 2017) was a Mexican film and television actor. He was known for his roles in the telenovelas Muchachitas and Rubí. In film, he was known for his role in the 1982 drama Mexican film Aquel famoso Remington. He was born in Mexico City, Mexico. His career lasted from 1962 until his death in 2017.

Death
Medellín died on 18 June 2017 at a hospital in Mexico City at the age of 83.

Filmography

References

External links
 Biography at Alma Latina 
 

1934 births
2017 deaths
Mexican male film actors
Mexican male telenovela actors
Mexican male television actors
Male actors from Mexico City